Ioakim Ioakim (born September 16, 1975) is a Cypriot former footballer. Ioakim was a rare one-club man, having spent his entire career at Omonia.

in 2008, he transferred very briefly to Olympiakos Nicosia in a player-coach role at the Olympiakos academy. However, he subsequently announced his retirement for family reasons. He has previously held assistant manager roles at Omonia and Alki Larnaca.

External links
 

1975 births
Living people
Cypriot footballers
Cyprus international footballers
Cypriot First Division players
AC Omonia players
AC Omonia managers
Association football defenders
Sportspeople from Nicosia
Cypriot football managers